America First Event Center is a 5,300-seat multi-purpose arena in Cedar City, Utah. It was built in 1985.  It is home to the Southern Utah University Thunderbirds basketball, volleyball and gymnastics teams. The America First Event Center is also the centerpiece venue for the Utah Summer Games. The arena was previously known as the Centrum Arena but was renamed in 2017 as part of a naming rights deal with America First Credit Union valued at $1.5 million over 10 years.

See also
 List of NCAA Division I basketball arenas

References

External links
 America First Event Center at Southern Utah Thunderbirds Athletics

Basketball venues in Utah
College basketball venues in the United States
Buildings and structures in Cedar City, Utah
Tourist attractions in Iron County, Utah
Sports venues completed in 1985
Southern Utah Thunderbirds basketball
1985 establishments in Utah